Xiao Rang is a fictional character in Water Margin, one of the Four Great Classical Novels of Chinese literature. Nicknamed "Sacred Handed Scholar", he ranks 46th among the 108 Stars of Destiny and tenth among the 72 Earthly Fiends.

Background
Xiao Rang, who lives in Jizhou (濟州; around present-day Jining and Heze, Shandong), is a scholar good in imitating hand-writings including the distinctive ones of the four famous calligraphers of his time -- Su Dongpo, Huang Tingjian, Mi Fu and Cai Jing. Xiao, nicknamed "Sacred Handed Scholar" for his rare expertise, is a friend of Wu Yong before the latter became the chief strategist of the Liangshan Marsh outlaws.

Becoming an outlaw
When Song Jiang is in Jiangzhou (江州; present-day Jiujiang, Jiangxi), where he is exiled for killing his mistress Yan Poxi, he could move in and out of prison freely with permission of the chief warden Dai Zong, a friend of Wu Yong. One day he gets drunk in a restaurant alone. Lamenting his misfortunes, he writes a seditious poem on a wall in the restaurant, which he forgets the next day. Huang Wenbing, a petty official, discovers the poem and reports it to Cai Jiu, the governor of Jiangzhou, leading to Song being locked up and flogged. Cai Jiu orders Dai Zong to take a letter to his father Grand Tutor Cai Jing in the imperial capital Dongjing (東京; present-day Kaifeng, Henan), from whom he seeks advice on the matter.

Passing by Liangshan, Dai Zong is drugged in an inn of the stronghold run by Zhu Gui. Zhu discovers Cai Jiu's letter on Dai and takes him to the bandit chiefs, who learn from Dai the plight of Song Jiang. Wu Yong suggests fooling Cai Jiu to send Song to Dongjing, as it would be easier to rescue him when he is on the road. To forge a letter from Cai Jing requires the help of the scholar Xiao Rang, who could imitate the Grand Tutor's handwriting, and the craftsman Jin Dajian, who could replicate his personal seal. Dai Zong travels to the homes of the two men, who are told their skills are needed for the renovation of a temple. They are lured to the vicinity of Liangshan, where they are taken to the stronghold. Finding themselves trapped, Jin and Xiao have no choice but join Liangshan. They create the fake letter as instructed by Wu Yong.

But the seal affixed to the letter happens to be one not appropriate for correspondence between fathers and sons. The letter fools Cai Jiu but not Huang Wenbing, who points out the giveaway. Cai Jiu orders Song Jiang and Dai Zong be executed. Meanwhile, having realised the mistake, Wu Yong sends many chieftains to Jiangzhou, where they save the two just before they are beheaded.

Life at Liangshan
Xiao Rang is appointed as the chief secretary of Liangshan in charge of all documents and correspondence after the 108 Stars of Destiny came together in what is called the Grand Assembly. 

When Grand Marshal Gao Qiu leads a military attack against Liangshan, he is being captured by the outlaws. But Liangshan releases him on the condition that he puts in a good word with Emperor Huizong to help them win an amnesty. Xiao Rang and Yue He go with him to represent Liangshan's case to the emperor. However,  Gao breaks his promise and detains them in his house. They are extricated by Dai Zong and Yan Qing.

Campaigns
The Liangshan outlaws finally receive amnesty from the emperor with the help of the courtesan Li Shishi and other government officials. Xiao Rang participates in campaigns against the Liao invaders and rebel forces in Song territory, which are ordered by the court as a way for the outlaws to atone for their crimes.

In the attack on Jingnan (荊南; around present-day Jingzhou, Hubei) in the campaign against Wang Qing, Xiao Rang, Jin Dajian and Pei Xuan are captured by the enemy. The three, who refused to surrender and divulge any information under torture, are freed when Xiao Jiasui and others revolt against Wang, causing Jingnan to fall.

Before the Liangshan heroes go on their last campaign, which targets Fang La, Xiao Rang is summoned to Dongjing, where he is made the private secretary of Cai Jing.

References
 
 
 
 
 
 
 

72 Earthly Fiends
Fictional characters from Shandong